The Wakhjir Pass, also spelled Vakhjir Pass, is a mountain pass in the Hindu Kush or Pamirs at the eastern end of the Wakhan Corridor, the only potentially navigable pass between Afghanistan and China in the modern era. With a difference of 3.5 hours, the Afghanistan–China border has the sharpest official change of clocks of any international frontier (UTC+4:30 in Afghanistan to UTC+8, in China). China refers to the pass as South Wakhjir Pass, as there is a northern pass on the Chinese side.

Overview

There is no road across the pass. On the Chinese side, the immediate region is only accessible to military personnel. In the summer of 2009, the Chinese Ministry of National Defense began construction of a new road to within  of the border for use by border guards. The valley to the east of Wakhjir Pass on the Chinese side is the Chalachigu Valley. It is entirely closed to visitors; however, local residents and herders from the area are permitted access. The Chinese refer to it as the portion of Wakhan Corridor in China.

This is the source of the Wakhjir River, which ultimately flows to the Amu Darya (Oxus). The cave is therefore claimed as a source of the Amu Darya.

History
Traditionally, the pass is inaccessible for at least five months out of the year and is accessible irregularly for the remainder of the year. The terrain is extremely difficult, although Aurel Stein reported that the immediate approaches to the pass were "remarkably easy". There are few records of successful crossings by foreigners. Historically, the pass was a trading route between Badakhshan and Yarkand used by merchants from Bajaor. Wakhjir Pass is part of the Silk Road. It is believed that the Chinese Buddhist pilgrim Xuanzang traveled via this pass on his return trip to China in approximately 649 AD. Marco Polo purportedly crossed the pass when he traveled through the Pamirs, although he did not mention the pass by name.  The Jesuit priest Benedict Goëz crossed from the Wakhan to China between 1602 and 1606. The next oldest accounts are from the period of the Great Game in the late 19th century.  In 1868, a pundit known as the Mirza, working for the Great Trigonometric Survey of India, crossed the pass.  There were further crossings in 1874 by Captain T.E. Gordon of the British Army, in 1891 by Francis Younghusband, and in 1894 by Lord Curzon.  In May 1906, Sir Aurel Stein crossed the pass and reported that at that time, the pass was used by only 100 pony loads of goods each way annually.  Since then, the only Westerner to have crossed the pass seems to have been H.W. Tilman in 1947.

In 1895 the pass was established as the border between China and Afghanistan in an agreement between the British and the Russians, although the Chinese and Afghans did not finally agree on the border until 1963.

It is believed that in more recent times, the pass is sometimes used as a low-intensity drug smuggling route, and is used to transport opium made in Afghanistan to China. Afghanistan has asked China on several occasions to open the border in the Wakhan Corridor for economic reasons or as an alternative supply route for fighting the Taliban insurgency. However, China has resisted, largely due to unrest in its far western province of Xinjiang, which borders the corridor. , it was reported that the United States had asked China to open the corridor.

Climate
Wakhjir Pass has a tundra climate (Köppen: ET) with an ice cap climate (EF) characteristics, With cold to frigid weather year-round. The warmest months of July and August are slightly above freezing.

See also
 Tegermansu Pass
 Beyik Pass 
 Kilik Pass 
 Mintaka Pass 
 China–Tajikistan border
 China–Pakistan border

Notes

References

External links 
 
 Wakhan & the Afghan Pamir - In the footsteps of Marco Polo - Brochure of the region by Aga Khan Foundation

Mountain passes of China
Mountain passes of Afghanistan
Mountain passes of Xinjiang
Wakhan
Afghanistan–China border
Landforms of Badakhshan Province
Sites along the Silk Road
Mountain passes of the Pamir